The 2019 Canadian Championship Final was a two-legged series to determine the winner of the 2019 Canadian Championship, Canada's primary domestic cup competition in men's soccer. The series was played between Canadian Classique rivals Montreal Impact and three-time defending champions Toronto FC, both members of Major League Soccer. It was the third time Montreal and Toronto have met in the finals since the cup format was adopted in 2011; with the Impact winning in 2014, and Toronto winning in 2017.

The first leg was hosted by the Impact at Saputo Stadium in Montreal on September 18, while the second leg was played at BMO Field in Toronto on September 25. Montreal Impact won their fourth title and first since 2014, following a 3–1 victory on penalties after both legs finished 1–0 to the home side.

As winners, Montreal qualified for the 2020 CONCACAF Champions League as Canada's sole direct entrant.

Teams

Venues

Background
This was the third time Montreal Impact and Toronto FC faced one another in the Canadian Championship final. The first time, in 2014, Montreal Impact won 2–1 over two legs to win the Voyageurs Cup and advance to the 2014–15 CONCACAF Champions League. Montreal subsequently made it to the Champions League final, where they were ultimately defeated by Mexican club América. 

The more recent finals meeting took place in 2017, where Toronto FC won 3–2 on aggregate. Toronto also advanced to the CONCACAF Champions League final after having qualified through the Canadian Championship, losing to Guadalajara on penalties.

Montreal Impact

Montreal Impact were drawn into the third qualifying round where they played Canadian Premier League side York9 FC from Toronto. Over two legs, they defeated York9 3–2 on aggregate to advance to the semi-finals. In the semi-finals they went on to play another CPL side, Cavalry FC from Calgary, who had just defeated fellow MLS side Vancouver Whitecaps FC to advance to play the Impact. Montreal defeated Cavalry 2–1 in Montreal, and 1–0 in Calgary for a 3–1 aggregate victory to advance to the finals.

Toronto FC

As the defending champions, Toronto FC qualified directly to the semi-finals where they played the Ottawa Fury of the USL Championship. Toronto won the first leg 2–0 in Ottawa at TD Place Stadium, followed by a 3–0 victory at home one week later August 14 to win the series 5–0 on aggregate and advance to the finals.

Path to the final

Match details

First leg

Second leg

See also
2019 Canadian Premier League Finals
Canadian Championship
Canadian Classique
Miracle in Montreal

References

External links

2019 in Canadian soccer
CF Montréal matches
Toronto FC matches
Sports competitions in Montreal
Sports competitions in Toronto
September 2019 sports events in Canada
2010s in Montreal
2019 in Quebec
2019 in Toronto
Canadian Championship Final 2019